DC Rajesh (born 28 March 1975) was an Indian cricketer. He was a right-handed batsman and a right-arm medium-fast bowler who played for Goa. He was born in Bangalore.

Rajesh's first cricketing appearances came for the Karnataka Under-19s team, during the 1992-93 Cooch Behar Trophy, though he played no further competitive cricket until 1999.  Rajesh played in the Gold Cup tournament between the 1999-2000 and 2001-02 seasons.

Rajesh made two first-class appearances, during the 2003-04 season, his debut coming against Orissa. Playing as a tailender, he scored a total of 15 runs in his two debut innings, but in his second, and final, match, scored a duck in his first innings and four runs in his second.

External links
DC Rajesh at Cricket Archive 

1975 births
Living people
Indian cricketers
Goa cricketers
Cricketers from Bangalore